A public holiday, national holiday, or legal holiday is a holiday generally established by law and is usually a non-working day during the year.

Types

Civic holiday 
A civic holiday, also known as a civil or work holiday, is a day that is legally recognized and celebrated as a holiday in a particular sovereign state or jurisdictional subdivision of such, e.g., a state or a province.  It is usually a day that the legislature, parliament, congress or sovereign has declared by statute, edict or decree as a non-working day when the official arms of government such as the court system are closed.   In federal states there may also be different holidays for the constituent states or provinces, as in the United States where holidays that were established by the federal government are called federal holidays.  Such days may or may not be counted in calculating the statute of limitations in legal actions and are usually days when non-custodial parents are given alternating visitation or access to their children from a prior marriage or relationship according to a parenting schedule.

The term may also be used to distinguish between days that may be celebrated as secular holidays rather than religious holidays such as the celebration of New Year's Day on January 1 (Gregorian calendar) and January 14 (Julian Calendar) in certain eastern Orthodox Christian countries such as Russia.

Bank holiday 
In the British Isles, the term bank holiday is used to refer to days established as public holidays in statute law. In England and Wales, Good Friday and Christmas Day are known as common law holidays, as they have been celebrated by custom since time immemorial. Bank holidays were introduced in the late 19th century to extend the labour rights citizens have on common law holidays to four additional days.

Impacts 
The major social function of public holidays is the co-ordination of leisure time. This co-ordination has costs, such as congestion and overcrowding (in leisure facilities, on transport systems) and benefits (easier for people to arrange social occasions).

Public holidays constitute an important part of nation building and become important symbols of the nation. They can build and legitimise the nation and are intended to foster national unity, social cohesion and popular identification. They provide national governments with annual opportunities to reinforce the status of the nation. Sabine Marschall argues that public holidays can be regarded as sites of memory, which preserve particular representations of historical events and particular national or public heroes.

Public holidays by country 

In some countries, there are national laws that make some or all public holidays paid holidays, and in other countries, there are no such laws, though many firms provide days off as paid or unpaid holidays.

They vary by country and may vary by year. With 36 days a year, Nepal is the country with the highest number of public holidays but it observes six working days a week. India ranks second with 21 national holidays, followed by Colombia and the Philippines at 18 each. Likewise, China and Hong Kong enjoy 17 public breaks a year.  Some countries (e.g. Cambodia) with a longer, six-day workweek, have more holidays (28) to compensate.

New Zealand 

In New Zealand, a national law sets 12 paid public holidays.  If a worker works on a public holiday, they are to be paid 1.5 times their regular rate of pay and be given another alternate day off.

South Africa 
Sabie Marschall argues that the revised set of public holidays in post-Apartheid South Africa attempts to produce and celebrate a particular national identity in line with the political goal of the rainbow nation.

United States 

In the United States, there is no national law requiring that employers pay  employees who do not work on public holidays (although the U.S. states of Rhode Island and Massachusetts have paid holiday laws).

Criticism
Some commentators in the United Kingdom have called for the abolishment of public holidays. In The Independent, associate editor Sean O'Grady argued that bank holidays no longer suit the lives of British families. As employers can count public holidays against He argues that people should themselves have the option to decide when to take their holiday allocation. He argues that the dispersion of holidays would ease congestion on road and train networks and reduce travel prices.

Some public holidays are controversial. For example, in the United States a federal holiday commemorates explorer Christopher Columbus, who is said to have discovered the Americas by Europeans. This has led to protests at Columbus Day parades and calls for the public holiday to be changed. Some states have adopted the day as Indigenous People's Day rather than Columbus Day.

See also

 Bank holiday
 List of holidays by country
 :Category:Lists of public holidays by country

References